The 1980 FIBA Africa Under-18 Championship was the 3rd FIBA Africa Under-18 Championship, played under the rules of FIBA, the world governing body for basketball, and the FIBA Africa thereof. The tournament took place in Luanda, Angola from 7 to 13 September 1980.

Angola ended the round-robin tournament with a 5–0 unbeaten record to win their first title.

The winner qualified for the 1983 FIBA Under-19 World Championship.

Participating teams

Squads

Group A

Group B

7th place match

Semi-finals

5th place match

3rd place match

Final

Final standings

Awards

See also
 1981 FIBA Africa Championship

External links
Official website

References
 "Jornal de Angola"

1980 in African basketball
1980 in Angolan sport
FIBA Africa Under-18 Championship
Basketball in Angola